Richard Hightower (born September 15, 1980) is an American football coach currently serving as special teams coordinator of the Chicago Bears of the National Football League (NFL).

Coaching career
Hightower was hired by the San Francisco 49ers on February 17, 2017 as special teams coordinator. Previously he held the role of assistant special teams coach with the Chicago Bears in 2016 and the 49ers in 2015. He has also held coaching roles with both the Houston Texans and the Washington Redskins. He was hired by the Chicago Bears on February 6, 2022 as the special teams coordinator.

College football career
Hightower played college football at the University of Texas with Kyle Shanahan. As a senior in 2002, after years of being a walk on, in front of the entire team, coach Mack Brown awarded Hightower, and fellow special teams standout Michael Ungar and Shanahan with scholarships.

References

External links
San Francisco 49ers bio

1980 births
Living people
San Francisco 49ers coaches
Texas Longhorns football players
Chicago Bears coaches
Players of American football from Houston
Houston Texans coaches
Washington Redskins coaches
Sportspeople from Houston
African-American coaches of American football
African-American players of American football
21st-century African-American sportspeople
20th-century African-American people